The 1953 Cincinnati Redlegs season was a season in American baseball. The team finished sixth in the National League with a record of 68–86, 37 games behind the Brooklyn Dodgers. The team changed its name from "Reds" to "Redlegs" prior to this season in response to rampant American anti-communist sentiment during this time period.

Offseason 
 October 13, 1952: Jim Bolger was purchased by the Redlegs from the Buffalo Bisons.
 October 14, 1952: Cal Abrams, Joe Rossi, and Gail Henley were traded by the Redlegs to the Pittsburgh Pirates for Gus Bell.

Regular season

Season standings

Record vs. opponents

Notable transactions 
 May 1953: Brooks Lawrence was acquired by the Redlegs from the Cleveland Indians.
 May 23, 1953: Eddie Erautt was traded by the Redlegs to the St. Louis Cardinals for Jackie Collum.

Roster

Player stats

Batting

Starters by position 
Note: Pos = Position; G = Games played; AB = At bats; H = Hits; Avg. = Batting average; HR = Home runs; RBI = Runs batted in

Other batters 
Note: G = Games played; AB = At bats; H = Hits; Avg. = Batting average; HR = Home runs; RBI = Runs batted in

Pitching

Starting pitchers 
Note: G = Games pitched; IP = Innings pitched; W = Wins; L = Losses; ERA = Earned run average; SO = Strikeouts

Other pitchers 
Note: G = Games pitched; IP = Innings pitched; W = Wins; L = Losses; ERA = Earned run average; SO = Strikeouts

Relief pitchers 
Note: G = Games pitched; W = Wins; L = Losses; SV = Saves; ERA = Earned run average; SO = Strikeouts

Farm system

References

External links
1953 Cincinnati Redlegs season at Baseball Reference

Cincinnati Reds seasons
Cincinnati Redlegs season
Cincinnati Reds